Otomaco and Taparita are two long-extinct languages of the Venezuelan Llanos.

In addition to Otomaco and Taparita, Loukotka (1968) also lists Maiba (Amaygua), an unattested extinct language that was once spoken in Apure State, Venezuela between the Cunaviche River and Capanaparo River.

Vocabulary
Loukotka (1968) lists the following basic vocabulary items for Otomac and Taparita.

{| class="wikitable sortable"
! gloss !! Otomac !! Taparita
|-
! one
| engá || enda
|-
! two
| dé || deñiaro
|-
! three
| yakia || deni
|-
! head
| dapad || dupea
|-
! eye
| inbad || indó
|-
! tooth
| miʔi || mina
|-
! man
| andua || mayná
|-
! water
| ya || ia
|-
! fire
| núa || muita
|-
! sun
| nua || mingua
|-
! maize
| onona || 
|-
! jaguar
| maéma || 
|-
! house
| augua || ñaña
|}

Additional vocabulary for Otomaco and Taparita are documented in Rosenblat (1936).

References

 
Extinct languages of South America
Languages of Venezuela
Language families